Immunet is a free, cloud-based, community-driven antivirus application, using the ClamAV and its own engine. The software is complementary with existing antivirus software. In January 2011 Immunet was acquired by Sourcefire.

The application is free-of-charge, although a commercial version is available. It claims to be lightweight and provides always up-to-date protection against the threats. Virus signature files are stored in the cloud, not on individual computers, so signature downloads are not required. Once a virus is detected and blocked for one user, all other Immunet users receive the same protection almost instantly. The software is noted for its ability to allow individual users to easily author their own signatures.

Products 
Immunet was previously provided by Sourcefire in two editions, Free (for personal use), and Plus (for commercial use).  As of June 10, 2014, the commercial version was discontinued, though Cisco (having acquired SourceFire) continued to support the free version.

At version 3.0 , Immunet Free offers protection based upon the virus definitions in the cloud, and an option to include the ClamAV off-line virus definitions for use when not connected to the Internet. Immunet advises that the free version be used alongside another antivirus program, and supports several particular such programs in the sense that they co-install properly and work in tandem during normal operations without any obvious interference or resource drag. This is a significant difference between Immunet and other contemporary antivirus products.

Effectiveness 
While independent testing has been performed, PCMag, in 2010, rated the product to be fair in its effectiveness.

Immunet's virus definitions are stored on servers available over the Internet, requiring less memory and system resource than antivirus  programs that reside on the user's computer. Cloud protection has been known to give better protection and detection, on the other hand, offline protection is not particularly good. Overall, the effectiveness of the Free product is average; the company recommends that users employ the Free product as an additional protection, rather than using it alone.

In Windows 8.1 and 10, older versions of Immunet such as 3.x only satisfies Virus protection but not Spyware and unwanted software protection in Action Center alerts on toolbar unlike other commercial antiviruses which satisfy both.

See also 

 Comparison of antivirus software

References

External links 
 
 ClamAV website

Cisco Systems
Antivirus software
Cloud applications
Windows security software